South Western Province was an electorate of the Victorian Legislative Council.

It was one of the six original upper house Provinces of the bi-cameral Victorian Parliament created in November 1856, initially it had five members. Victoria was a colony in Australia when South-Western Province was created.

The area of South Western Province was defined in the Victoria Constitution Act, 1855, as "Including the Counties of Grant, Grenville, and Polwarth." The Act came into effect in 1856.

It was finally abolished in 1979 after the redistribution of 1976 when several new provinces were created, including Geelong Province.

Members for South Western Province
These were members of the upper house province of the Victorian Legislative Council, five members initially. Three members after the redistribution of provinces in 1882, South Eastern, South Yarra, North Yarra, North Eastern, North Central, Melbourne East, Melbourne North, Melbourne South,  Melbourne West and Wellington Provinces were created. 
Two members after another redistribution of provinces in 1904 when Melbourne South and Melbourne West Provinces (and others) were created.

Election results

References

Former electoral provinces of Victoria (Australia)
1856 establishments in Australia
1979 disestablishments in Australia